Wand is an American psychedelic rock band from Los Angeles, California, United States, formed in 2013. The band consists of Cory Hanson (vocals, guitar), Sofia Arreguin (synth, vocals), Robert Cody (guitar), Lee Landey (bass) and Evan Burrows (drums).

Since their formation, the band has released five albums in five years: Ganglion Reef (2014), Golem (2015), 1000 Days (2015), Plum (2017) and Laughing Matter (2019).

History

Formation and Ganglion Reef (2013–2014)
Prior to forming Wand, vocalist and guitarist Cory Hanson performed under the moniker W.H.I.T.E. Hanson also played guitar with Mikal Cronin, and in the bands together PANGEA, and Meatbodies. Working on the songs that would become the band's debut album, Ganglion Reef, Hanson subsequently re-recorded his material after forming Wand with former art school classmates Lee Landey and Evan Burrows: "[I] found a band, and we re-recorded everything and then just started playing... really intensely." Regarding the band's name, Hanson noted: "We wanted a name that was kind of empty, like a wand is more of an idea, like a magical tool; it's a means, a vessel to execute a superhuman thing."

Wand released the album on fellow-garage rock act Ty Segall's Drag City imprint, God? Records, and subsequently supported him on tour. Regarding the experience, Hanson stated: "[The tour] was great, it was a little bit crazy for us because we've never toured before. And the turnout—it was just a lot of people, and we were all surprised by how warmly received, how receptive everyone was to hearing us play because no one had ever heard us before. And Ty's super fun to tour with."

Golem and 1000 Days (2015–2016)
The band quickly recorded its second studio album, Golem, with producer and engineer Chris Woodhouse, best known for his work with the garage rock act, Thee Oh Sees. The album was recorded in twelve days, with Hanson stating: "I went in thinking, 'Oh, this is going to be a really grimy, disgusting record with these really fucked-up guitars.' And then Chris sort of took a different turn, because he just kind of gave it a Big Star treatment. So the production is, like, bizarrely pristine and all of the performances are really fucked and weird."

Six months later, the band released its self-produced follow-up, 1000 Days, on Drag City. Prior to the album's recording and release, guitarist Daniel Martens temporarily stepped down from the band, with bass guitarist Lee Landey stating: "He's not touring with us this time because he's just had a baby." The band was subsequently referred to as a three-piece, with Martens remaining absent from press photographs.

Regarding a potential fourth album, Hanson noted: "I think we're a little more interested in having some more creative elbow room to push out something that feels like the right next step, rather than having this consistent output of record, tour, record, tour. Having a little bit more time to work could only benefit the way that we think about making records at this point." In 2016, the band added guitarist Robert Cody and keyboardist Sofia Arreguin to their core line-up.

Plum and Perfume (2017–2018)
On June 27, 2017, a video for the song "Plum" was released on the Drag City YouTube channel. A music video for the track "Bee Karma" was also released on August 10, 2017, directed by Hanson, utilising Super 8 film and starring his brother Casey.

The album Plum was subsequently released on September 22, 2017.

On February 27, 2018, a day after the band concluded their Plum tour, Cory Hanson announced on his Instagram that Wand would be releasing a thirty-minute EP entitled Perfume on May 25, 2018. A single song, "The Gift", was released on the day of the announcement.

Laughing Matter (2019-present)
Wand released their fifth album, Laughing Matter, on April 19, 2019. The album received positive reviews from both Pitchfork and Stereogum.

Side projects
Ty Segall and The Muggers
In 2016, both Cory Hanson and Evan Burrows were members of Ty Segall's backing band The Muggers, touring in support of Segall's eighth studio album, Emotional Mugger.

Cory Hanson - Solo work
2016 - The Unborn Capitalist from Limbo
2021 - Pale Horse Rider
2023 - Western Cum

Band members
Current members
Cory Hanson – vocals, guitar (2013–present)
Lee Landey – bass (2013–present)
Evan Burrows – drums (2013–present)
Robert Cody – guitar (2016–present)
Sofia Arreguin – vocals, synth (2016–present)

Former members
Daniel Martens – guitar (2013-2015)

Discography
Studio albums
Ganglion Reef (2014)
Golem (2015)
1000 Days (2015)
Plum (2017)
Laughing Matter (2019)
Spiders in the Rain (Live) (2022)

Other releases
 From a Capsule Underground (2017, demos and studio outtakes)
Perfume (2018, EP)

Singles
 "Machine Man" (2015)

References

American noise rock music groups
Drag City (record label) artists
Garage rock groups from California
Neo-psychedelia groups
Psychedelic rock music groups from California
Musical groups established in 2013
Musical groups from Los Angeles
2013 establishments in California